In Greek mythology, Nete  (Νήτη) was one of the three Muses of the lyre that were worshipped at Delphi, where the Temple of Apollo and the Oracle were located. Her name was also the lowest of the seven notes of the lyre. Her sisters that were worshipped along with her were Hypate and Mese. These three muses were comparable to the original three, Aoide, Melete, and Mneme. Alternatively, they were Cephisso, Apollonis, and Borysthenis, which portrayed them as the daughters of Apollo.

References

Greek Muses